Saint-Denis-du-Payré is a commune in the Vendée department in the Pays de la Loire region in western France.

The grasslands in the Natural Reserve of St-Denis-du-Payré has a protected colony of maritime Iris.

See also
Communes of the Vendée department

References

Communes of Vendée